A horn section is a group of musicians playing horns.  In an orchestra or concert band, it refers to the musicians who play the "French" horn, and in a British-style brass band it is the tenor horn players. In many popular music genres, the term is applied loosely to any group of woodwind or brass instruments, or a combination of woodwinds and brass.

Symphonic
In a symphony orchestra, the horn section is the group of symphonic musicians who play the French horn (or German horn or Vienna horn). These musicians are typically seated to the back of the ensemble and may be on either side at the director's discretion. Placing them to the left with their bells toward the audience increases the prominence of the section, whereas on the right, the sound reflects off the back of the stage. Most of the time, players are seated right to left from the director's view based on seating, with the principal horn (first horn) being seated on the right and fourth horn seated on the left. The section is ordered in this way so the principal horn may be heard by all players, as the principal sets the timbre and intonation of the section.

Popular music

Horn sections are an integral part of musical genres such as jazz, R&B, blues, soul, funk, calypso, Afrobeat, and gospel. Most of these horn sections feature some combination of saxophones, trumpets and trombones. More rarely, other wind or brass instruments such as flute, clarinet or tuba may be added. Other popular musical genres, such as rock, pop, hip-hop, latin, and country music also use horn sections. When only woodwinds are involved, the term "reed section" is often used, even when flutes are included .

Notable horn sections
Horn sections in blues bands and funk groups may be composed of session musicians playing arranged parts, or they may be a consistent group of musicians. A small number of horn sections use a consistent group of musicians who become well known as a unit.

 Paul Butterfield Blues Band
 Chicago
Fat Freddy's Drop
 The Empire Horns
 The Horny Horns
 The J.B.'s
 The Kick Horns
 The Know How
 The Memphis Horns
 Muscle Shoals Horns
 Phenix Horns from Earth, Wind & Fire
 Punk Funk Horns
 Seawind Horns
 Tower of Power
 The Miami Horns
Egypt 80
 The Uptown Horns

References
 
 

Musical groups
Horns